Rugby league is a team sport played in Ireland on an all-Ireland basis.

History 
In May 1934 Wigan beat Warrington 32–19 in an exhibition match in Dublin.  Twenty years later, in May 1954, Warrington were again defeated by Halifax in both Belfast (34–15) and Dublin (23–11).

The first rugby league club side to actually play in Ireland, Dublin Blues, were not formed until 1989. They consisted mostly of rugby union players who wanted to test themselves in the other code. The Blues competed against touring teams from Britain scoring victories over British amateur opposition.

In early 1995 the Rugby Football League development arm financed the position of a Development Officer for Ireland, providing a boost to the development of the game. This laid the basis for the formation of the national Ireland side, which played its first ever game on St Patrick's Day 1995, in Washington DC, defeating the USA 24–22.

Competitive matches were established between teams in Leinster and Ulster: Schoolboy matches were played between Dublin and Belfast schools, Open Age Clubs competed against each other in the All-Ireland Challenge Cup. Teams included Belfast Wildcats and Bangor Vikings from Ulster.

In 2011 an academy was set up in Limerick where talented players would be identified to sign with Super League clubs, 4 were eventually signed across St Helens R.F.C., Castleford Tigers and Leeds Rhinos.

Competitions

Ireland National League

Ulster League

Results

Provincial League

Results

The national team

There are two Ireland national rugby league teams – Ireland and Ireland A. Ireland is the primary team which is made up of Irish players who compete in leagues across the globe whereas Ireland A is made up of players who play in the amateur Irish Elite League only. Irish players are also eligible for the Great Britain national team.

Ireland also has a strong students  team who competed in the 2008 Students world cup and finished 2nd in the student's 4 nations tournament in 2009.

Governing body

In Ireland the governing body is Rugby League Ireland (RLI).

Media

There are two weekly rugby league newspapers in the UK Rugby Leaguer & League Express and League Weekly and two monthly magazines, Rugby League World and Thirteen Magazine. Most of their content covers the sport in Britain, Australia and New Zealand but Irish rugby league is also covered. These publications are usually only available by subscription in Ireland.

International rugby league magazine covers all rugby league internationally and has featured Ireland's domestic season, road to the world cup and interviewed Luke Ambler.

A rugby union publication called Emerald Rugby covers rugby league in Ireland each month.

BBC Sport own the rights to broadcast a highlights package called the Super League Show which was first broadcast in Northern Ireland in 2008. Prior to this it had only been broadcast in the North of England. Rugby League Raw is not broadcast in Northern Ireland despite the BBC owning the rights to do so. The BBC covers the Rugby League Challenge Cup from the rounds in which the top clubs enter.

BBC Radio Five Live and BBC Five Live Sports Extra carry commentary from a selection of Super League matches each week,.

Live Super League and National Rugby League games are shown on Sky Sports Arena with highlights also being shown on the channel. From the 2022 season, 10 live Super League games per season will be shown on Channel 4, the first time the league will be shown on terrestrial television. Championship games are shown on Premier Sports, with one game a week being aird.

Setanta Sports Ireland broadcast highlights of the 2005 and 2006 pre-season Dublin challenge matches, and the 2005 European Nations Cup, on its Sports Weekly and Sports Monthly programmes.

Manchester based Channel M show some National League and amateur rugby on their Code XIII programme.

Challenge Cup heritage
Since its formation in 1997, winners of the Irish Elite League have been eligible to play in the Rugby Football League's Challenge Cup. Resuts of Irish teams are:

See also

Rugby League Ireland
Ireland national rugby league team
Great Britain national rugby league team
Rugby league in the British Isles

References

External links

 Rugby League Ireland
 Irish History
 
 

 
Rugby league in the United Kingdom